Didem Ünsal (born 1 1April 1966, Ankara, Turkey) is a Turkish journalist, televion presenter, and author. She is specialized in health issues.

Background 
She was born in Ankara , Turkey on 11 April 1966. In 1987, she graduated from the Department of Radio and Television of the Faculty of Communication at Gazi University in Ankara.

Career 
Right after her graduation in 1987, she started working in the mewspaper Ulus in Ankara. From 1989 on, she comtinued her journalism career şn Istanbul, where she worked for the newspapers Sabah, Yeni Yüzyıl, Milliyet, and Hürriyet, as well as for the periodical Artı Haner^ and the television stations Bayrak Radio and Television (BRT) of Northern Cyprus and as a health editor at the Medical Channel. She dpecialized in her profession in health issues.

Works

References 

1966 births
Living people
People from Ankara
Gazi University alumni
Turkish women journalists
Turkish television journalists
Turkish columnists
Turkish writers
Ulus (newspaper) people
Hürriyet people
Milliyet people
Sabah (newspaper) people
Yeni Yüzyıl people